SUMO1/sentrin/SMT3 specific peptidase 3, also known as SENP3, is a protein which in humans is encoded by the SENP3 gene.

SENP3 together with SENP5, belongs to the Ulp1 branch in yeast and localize to nucleolus through B23/NPM1. SENP3 is associated and regulated by B23/nucleophosmin/NPM1 and involved in the regulation of ribosome biogenesis. SENP3 may be regulated by Arf-Mdm2-p53 pathway.

Further reading

References